Youngtown is a residential locality in the local government areas (LGA) of Launceston and Northern Midlands in the Launceston and Central LGA regions of Tasmania. The 2016 census has a population of 291 for the state suburb of Youngtown.
It is a southern suburb of Launceston. There is a football ground at Youngtown, the Youngtown Oval, which is where South Launceston Football club play their home games in the Tasmania State League. Youngtown Primary School is also located in the suburb.

History 
Youngtown was gazetted as a locality in 1963.

Youngtown is also where the minor locality of Franklin Village is located which was established in 1837. Most of the historic buildings of Franklin Village are gone, and the area is incorporated into nearby Youngtown. The remaining buildings include Franklin House which was built in 1838 and St James Anglican Church built 1845.

The suburb was named after Henry Young, the first governor of Tasmania.

Geography
The Midland Highway (National Route 1) forms the south-western boundary, and the Western Railway Line much of the eastern.

Road infrastructure
Route C402 (Hobart Road) passes through from north to south. Route C411 (Relbia Road) starts at an intersection with C402 and immediately exits to the south-east.

References

Suburbs of Launceston, Tasmania
Localities of City of Launceston
Localities of Northern Midlands Council